Surprise! is a 1995 short film by German director Veit Helmer. It won a Golden Space Needle award at the 1995 Seattle International Film Festival. The story centers on a Rube Goldberg device.

External links

1995 films
German drama short films

ja:Surprise!